The Progressive Socialist Party is a Lebanese political party. Its confessional base is in the Druze sect and its regional base is in Mount Lebanon Governorate, especially the Chouf District. Founded by Kamal Jumblatt in 1949, the party has been led by his son Walid since 1977.

Origins
The party was founded on 5 January 1949, and registered on 17 March the same year, under notification N°789. The founders comprised six individuals, all of different backgrounds. The most notable of these was Kamal Jumblatt. The others were Farid Jubran, Albert Adeeb, Abdallah Alayli, Fouad Rizk, and George Hanna. The PSP held the first conference for the Socialist Arab Parties in Lebanon, Syria, Egypt and Iraq in Beirut in 1951.

From 1951 through 1972 the party had between three and six deputies in parliament.

The PSP in the Lebanese Civil War (1975–1990)

Under Kamal Jumblatt's leadership, the PSP was a major element in the Lebanese National Movement (LNM), which supported Lebanon's Arab identity and sympathised with the Palestinians. Despite Jumblatt's initial reluctance to engage in paramilitarism, it built its own military wing, the People's Liberation Army (PLA) which proved to be one of the strongest private armies in the Lebanese Civil War of 1975 to 1990. It conquered much of Mount Lebanon and the Chouf District. Its main adversaries were the Kataeb Regulatory Forces militia, and later the Lebanese Forces militia (which absorbed the Kataeb). The PSP suffered a setback in 1977, when Kamal Jumblatt was assassinated. His son Walid succeeded him as leader of the party.

From the Israeli withdrawal from the Chouf in 1983 to the end of the civil war, the PSP ran the Civil Administration of the Mountain in the area under its control. Tolls levied at PSP/PLA militia checkpoints provided a major source of income for the administration, which provided social and public services.

The PSP played an important role in the Mountain War under the leadership of Walid Jumblatt: after the Israel Defense Forces (IDF) retreated from the Chouf District, important battles took place there between the PSP/PLA and the Lebanese Forces militia. Both the Lebanese Forces and the PSP/PLA were accused of committing massacres and atrocities against one another as tit-for-tat (revenge killings).

During the war years the PSP controlled the seaport at Jieh. In March 1989 General Michel Aoun established a blockade of the port which resulted in artillery exchanges between his forces and a combination of PSP, Amal and the Syrian Army in which at least 90 people were killed and several hundred wounded.

The post-war years
After the restoration of constitutional rule in 1989, the PSP was the major ally of Syria in Lebanon and its leader Walid Jumblatt was in close relations with the Syrian Army and intelligence generals in Lebanon, such as Ghazi Kanaan, and also with the Syrian Vice President Abdul Halim Khaddam. In the 1992 general election it won four seats.

In the post-Civil War period, Jumblatt was known for switching allegiances and acting as a kingmaker in deals between factions. The PSP participated in a number of governments, but, after the Syria Accountability Act and the UN Resolution 1559 and the change of the balance of powers in the region after the occupation of Iraq, joined the opposition and took up a position opposed to the role of Syria in Lebanon's politics. Unlike some opponents of the Syrian presence, Jumblatt did not oppose the presence of the Syrian army per se, but contended that the Syrian intelligence services were exerting undue influence.

Following the passage of United Nations Security Council Resolution 1559 in September 2004, calling for a Syrian withdrawal from Lebanon, Jumblatt was particularly prominent in the opposition. However, he was opposed to the demand that Hezbollah be disarmed, and insisted on maintaining relations with the Shia Islamist party. Later, he has drifted into sharp opposition towards the group, and has decided to support their disarmament, claiming that Syria and Iran are trying to take over Lebanon through Hezbollah. After the assassination of Rafic Hariri in February 2005, Jumblatt joined the anti-Syria camp despite his long support to Syria. As part of the March 14 Alliance, the PSP won 16 seats in the general elections held in 2005. It won eleven seats in the 2009 Lebanese general election and had three ministers in the 2009 First Cabinet of Saad Hariri (Ghazi Aridi, Akram Chehayeb, and Wael Abou Faour, all Druze). However, after the March 8 Alliance regained power in 2011, the PSP positioned itself in the political centre, and gave allegiance to the new government. Under the banner of the Democratic Gathering bloc, had three ministers (Alaaeddine Terro, Sunni, plus Aridi and Faour) in the 2011 Second Cabinet of Najib Mikati .

In late January 2011, Jumblatt declared not to support the disarming of Hezbollah. In 2013, it endorsed the 15 March alliance-led Cabinet of Tammam Salam (it had two ministers in this government, Faour and Akram Chehayeb). By 2015, the PLP was allied with the Future Movement and it had two ministers (Marwan Hamadeh and Ayman Shkeir) in the 2016 Second Cabinet of Saad Hariri, led by the Future Movement and two ministers again (Chehayeb and Faour) in the 2019 Third Cabinet of Saad Hariri.

With the onset of the Syrian civil war in 2011, Jumblatt and the PSP clearly showed their support for the Syrian opposition, and urged the Syrian Druze community to stand against the Assad government, and join the rebels.

At the ceremony marking the 40th anniversary of killing of Kamal Jumblatt in Moukhtara on 19 February 2017, Walid Jumblatt symbolically gave his keffiyeh to his son Taymour Jumblatt, symbolically marking the generational shift in the party leadership. That year, Jumblatt again refrained from saying Hezbollah should be disarmed. In the 2018 Lebanese general election, the Democratic Gathering bloc, the PSP's parliamentary platform, fielded 10 candidates across the country. For the first time since 1992, Walid Jumblatt did not stand as a candidate, with Taymour taking over as the party leader. The party fielded candidates for 3 out of 4 Druze seats in Mount Lebanon IV, keeping with the tradition of leaving a seat uncontested to help Lebanese Democratic Party chief Talal Arslan get elected. PSP joined joint lists with the Future Movement in Beirut II, Bekaa II and Mount Lebanon IV, and with Lebanese Forces in Mount Lebanon III and Mount Lebanon IV. It dropped to just nine seats in the 2018 election. The party served in the opposition to the short-lived 2019 Cabinet of Hassan Diab, returning to power as part of the Third Cabinet of Najib Mikati in 2021, with just one minister, Abbas Halabi.

Electoral summary

See also
2008 conflict in Lebanon
Al-Mourabitoun
Lebanese Civil War
Lebanese Communist Party
Lebanese National Movement
Popular Guard
War of the Camps

Notes

References

Edgar O'Ballance, Civil War in Lebanon, 1975-92, Palgrave Macmillan, London 1998. 
Farid El-Kazen, The Breakdown of the State in Lebanon 1967-1976, I.B. Tauris, London 2000. 
Fawwaz Traboulsi, Identités et solidarités croisées dans les conflits du Liban contemporain; Chapitre 12: L'économie politique des milices: le phénomène mafieux, Thèse de Doctorat d'Histoire – 1993, Université de Paris VIII, 2007. (in French)
Ken Guest, Lebanon, in Flashpoint! At the Front Line of Today’s Wars, Arms and Armour Press, London 1994, pp. 97–111. 
Walid Khalidi, Conflict and Violence in Lebanon: Confrontation in the Middle East, fourth printing (Cambridge, MA: Harvard Studies in International Affairs, 1984).

External links
Progressive Socialist Party official site (in Arabic) redirect to http://anbaaonline.com as of 8 January 2021
PSP Al Anbaa official newspaper site (in Arabic)

Further reading
Christopher Solomon, A look back at Kamal Jumblatt and the Progressive Socialist Party, 16 March 2019, Syria Comment

 
1949 establishments in Lebanon
Democratic socialist parties in Asia
History of the Druze
Factions in the Lebanese Civil War
Full member parties of the Socialist International
Lebanese National Movement
Political parties established in 1949
Secularism in Lebanon
Progressive Alliance
Social democratic parties in Lebanon